Gubkin is a town in Belgorod Oblast, Russia. Gubkin may also refer to:

FC Gubkin, an association football club base in Gubkin
Gubkin (surname)
Gubkin Russian State University of Oil and Gas in Moscow, Russia